WCHQ (1360 AM, Super Q) was a radio station licensed to serve Camuy, Puerto Rico. The station was owned by  Aurio A. Matos (President and General Manager of the station).

History

The station was assigned the WCHQ call letters by the Federal Communications Commission (FCC) on December 23, 1970. The company has had multiple ownership changes. Camuy Broadcasting Corporation sold WCHQ to Del Pueblo Radio Corporation in 1984. At that time, the station was known as "13-Q AM".

Expanded Band assignment

On March 17, 1997 the FCC announced that eighty-eight stations had been given permission to move to newly available "Expanded Band" transmitting frequencies, ranging from 1610 to 1700 kHz, with WCHQ authorized to move from 1360 to 1660 kHz. A construction permit for the expanded band station was assigned the call letters WGIT on December 14, 2000. WGIT later moved to Canovanas.

Later history

On July 25, 2000, Del Pueblo Radio Corporation announced that it would sell WCHQ to Aurio A. Matos. The deal was completed on July 30, 2000.

An FCC policy for expanded band authorizations was that both the original station and its expanded band counterpart could operate simultaneously for up to five years, after which owners would have to turn in one of the two licenses, depending on whether they preferred the new assignment or elected to remain on the original frequency. On December 24, 2003, after 33 years on the air, WCHQ went silent and was forced to shut down. On April 5, 2004, the station's license was cancelled and the call sign deleted from its database by the FCC.

References

External links
 

CHQ
Defunct radio stations in the United States
Radio stations established in 1970
Radio stations disestablished in 2004
2004 disestablishments in Puerto Rico
1970 establishments in Puerto Rico
CHQ
Camuy, Puerto Rico